Katsumi Kawano (born 28 July 1965) is a Japanese former volleyball player who competed in the 1992 Summer Olympics.

References

1965 births
Living people
Japanese men's volleyball players
Olympic volleyball players of Japan
Volleyball players at the 1992 Summer Olympics